The following structures in Raichur district have been designated as Monuments of National Importance by the Archaeological Survey of India (ASI).

List of monuments 

|}

See also 
 List of Monuments of National Importance in Bangalore circle
 List of Monuments of National Importance in Belgaum district
 List of Monuments of National Importance in Bidar district
 List of Monuments of National Importance in Bijapur district
 List of Monuments of National Importance in Dharwad district
 List of Monuments of National Importance in Gulbarga district
 List of Monuments of National Importance in North Kanara district
 List of Monuments of National Importance in India for other Monuments of National Importance in India
 List of State Protected Monuments in Karnataka

References 

Karnataka, Raichur district
Monuments of National Importance